The Passerelle, also known as the Luxembourg Viaduct, is a viaduct in Luxembourg City, in southern Luxembourg.  Nowadays it runs from the south into the city centre, Ville Haute, carrying road traffic across the Pétrusse valley and connecting Avenue de la Gare to Boulevard Franklin Delano Roosevelt. It is 290 m long, with 24 arches, and 45 m above the valley floor.

It is also known as the Old Bridge by people from Luxembourg City.  The 'new bridge' in this comparison is the Adolphe Bridge, which was built between 1900 and 1903.

The Passerelle was built between 1859 and 1861 to connect the city centre with Luxembourg's new railway station, which was located away from the city centre so as to not detract from the defensive capabilities of the city's fortress. It was conceived by the engineers Achille N. Grenier and Auguste Letellier, and built by the British company Waring Brothers.

See also
History of rail transport in Luxembourg

External links

 

Bridges in Luxembourg City
Bridges completed in 1861
1861 establishments in Luxembourg